This is a list of Danish television related events from 1969.

Events

Debuts

Television shows

Ending this year

Births
6 March - Nikolaj Koppel, musician & journalist
20 March - Claus Elming, TV host & commentator

Deaths

See also
1969 in Denmark